Kaifong associations (Chinese: 街坊會) or kaifong welfare associations (Chinese: 街坊福利會) are traditional mutual aid organisations which emerged in Hong Kong after the Second World War. They were set up with the help of the Secretariat for Chinese Affairs, particularly the Society Welfare Council, of the British colonial government, which had the intention of developing non-governmental civil society for the purpose of promoting moderate politics among the general public. The term kaifong is a Cantonese romanisation of the Chinese 街坊, which means people living in the same neighbourhood, and kaifong associations mainly aim at serving the residents of specific neighbourhoods.

The main purpose was to provide low cost or free services in areas such as education and health care for the many refugees from China. By 1958, there were twenty-one; by 1958, twenty-eight. After 1958, the government tried to use the kaifong associations to communicate with the local population. In 1960, kaifong associations extended their services to areas such as legal support or environmental protection.

Nevertheless, many kaifong associations remain active today.

List 

 Aberdeen Kai-fong Welfare Association
 Chai Wan Resettlement Kaifong Welfare Association
 Cheung Sha Wan Kaifong Welfare Association
 Chuk Yuen Cottage Area Kaifong Welfare Advancement Committee
 Mongkok Kaifong Association
 Sham Shui Po Kaifong Welfare Advancement Association
 Tai Hang Sai Kaifong Welfare Association
 Tsim Sha Tsui Kaifong Welfare Association
 Wang Tau Hom Resettlement Kaifong Welfare Association
 Yaumati Kaifong Welfare Advancement Association

See also
 Rural Representative elections

References

Further reading
 The Kaifong Associations and the Society of Hong Kong. Aline K. Wong (1972). Taipei: Orient Cultural Service. .
 Society and Politics in Hong Kong. Lau Siu-kai (1982). Hong Kong: Chinese University Press. .

Politics of Hong Kong
Mutual organizations